Penion lineatus is a species of medium-sized marine snail or whelk, belonging to the true whelk family Buccinidae. It was described in 2018.

Description
Adult shells are between 68 mm and 172 mm in length. The shell protoconch is cream coloured and the teleoconch is covered in yellow or brown bands.

Distribution
Penion lineatus is endemic to waters surrounding the Three Kings Islands and Cape Reinga north of mainland New Zealand.

References

External links
 Collections at Museum of New Zealand Te Papa Tongarewa Taxon: Penion lineatus Marshall, Hills & Vaux, 2018

Buccinidae
Gastropods of New Zealand
Gastropods described in 2018